The Institute for Quality and Efficiency in Healthcare (IQWiG) is a German agency responsible for assessing the quality and efficiency of medical treatments, including drugs, non-drug interventions (e.g. surgical procedures), diagnostic and screening methods, and treatment and disease management. IQWiG also supplies health information to patients and the general public.

The organization is independent of the pharmaceutical industry, contracted solely by the Federal Ministry of Health and the Joint Federal Committee.

Structure 
IQWiG was founded in 2004 under the directorship of Dr Peter Sawicki, who was replaced in September 2010 by Dr Jürgen Windeler. Windeler retired from the position in 2023, succeeded in the post by Dr Thomas Kaiser. Its deputy director is Dr Stefan Lange.

IQWiG is divided into the following departments, which publish reports:

 Drug Assessment
 Non-Drug Interventions
 Quality of Health Care
 Medical Biometry
 Health Economics

General health information, written in plain language, is additionally produced by a Health Information department.

These departments are also supported by Administration and Communication departments.

It regularly communicates with similar organisations in other countries, such as with the National Institute for Health and Clinical Excellence (NICE) in the UK and the Haute Autorité de Santé (HAS) in France.

Most noticed reports 
IQWiG hit international headlines in October 2010 with a report slamming Reboxetine as inefficient and harmful.

Similarly, in September 2010, another study rebuffed the use of Venlafaxine and Duloxetine as first-line treatment in major depression, but recommend them as  a second line option.

The use of Memantine in Alzheimer's patients was deemed as insufficiently supported by scientific evidence. This led Merz Pharma to provide additional data, and the Institute to change its evaluation.

A report in 2010 indicated that long-acting insulin analogues showed no benefits over intermediate-acting insulin for the treatment of type I diabetes.

See also 
 AMNOG

References 

Health care quality
German federal agencies
National agencies for drug regulation
Regulators of biotechnology products
Government agencies established in 2004
Medical and health organisations based in North Rhine-Westphalia
Organisations based in Cologne
Regulation in Germany